USS Vulcan is a name used more than once by the U.S. Navy:

 , a schooner commissioned on 31 May 1898.
 , a collier commissioned 2 October 1909.
 , a repair ship commissioned 14 June 1941.

United States Navy ship names